Calymmatium is a genus of flowering plants belonging to the family Brassicaceae.

Its native range is Central Asia, Afghanistan.

Species:

Calymmatium draboides 
Calymmatium notorrhizum

References

Brassicaceae
Brassicaceae genera